Samuel E. Dagogo-Jack is a Nigerian American physician
and the A.C. Mullins Endowed Professor in Translational Research, Professor of Medicine, and Chief, Division of Endocrinology, Diabetes, and Metabolism at the University of Tennessee Health Science Center, Memphis, Tennessee.  He is also an Editor of the Journal of Clinical Endocrinology & Metabolism.

He is Director of the Postgraduate Specialist Training Program in Endocrinology, Diabetes, and Metabolism at UTHSC, and Director of the Clinical Research Unit, Clinical and Translational Research Institute at UTHSC. Dr. Dagogo-Jack served as President (Medicine &  Science) of the American Diabetes Association from 2015-2015 and is a recipient of the Banging Medal for Leadership from the ADA.

Dr. Dagogo-Jack earned a medical degree (MBBS) from the University of Ibadan Medical School in Nigeria, was a resident in Internal Medicine and Endocrinology at the Royal Victoria Infirmary, University of Newcastle, UK, and was certified as a member of the Royal College of Physicians (MRCP) in 1982. He also earned research degrees of Master of Science at the University of Newcastle in 1988 and a Doctor of Medicine degree at the University of Ibadan in  1994). He additionally had Fellowship training in Metabolism at Washington University School of Medicine, St. Louis, MO in 1992, and served as a faculty member in the Division of Endocrinology, Diabetes and Metabolism there.

He developed the first radioimmunoassay for an epidermal growth factor (EGF) in human saliva, isolated EGF from mouse thyroid, and worked on  the regulation of EGF in mice and humans. His work with Philip E. Cryer, MD led to the discovery of the syndrome of hypoglycemia-associated autonomic failure and development of methodology for reversal of hypoglycemia unawareness.

References

External links
 official page at University of Tennessee
 http://www.diabetes.org/about-us/who-we-are/officers/
 http://care.diabetesjournals.org/content/diacare/39/1/3.full.pdf
 https://news.uthsc.edu/samuel-dagogo-jack-md-named-president-medicine-science-by-the-american-diabetes-association/

American endocrinologists
Living people
University of Ibadan alumni
Nigerian endocrinologists
Alumni of Newcastle University
Nigerian expatriate academics in the United States
University of Tennessee people
Year of birth missing (living people)